James Atherton (1872 – after 1895) was a footballer who played in the Football League for Leicester Fosse. He also played for South Shore, Blackpool, Kettering and New Brompton.

References

1872 births
Year of death missing
Sportspeople from Lancaster, Lancashire
Association football wing halves
English footballers
South Shore F.C. players
Blackpool F.C. players
Leicester City F.C. players
Kettering Town F.C. players
Gillingham F.C. players
English Football League players